Frank James Buncom Jr. (November 2, 1939 – September 15, 1969) was an American professional football player who was a linebacker in the American Football League (AFL). He played most of his career with the San Diego Chargers and is member of the Chargers Hall of Fame.

College career
After graduating from Dorsey High School in Los Angeles, Buncom attended junior college at East Los Angeles College. He then played college football at the University of Southern California, where he lettered in the 1960 and 1961 seasons.

Professional career
Buncom played for seven seasons in the AFL with the San Diego Chargers (1962-1967) and the Cincinnati Bengals (1968).

He was a three-time AFL All-Star, in 1964, 1965, and 1967.

He was chosen by the Bengals in the 1968 AFL allocation draft for the expansion Bengals. He was a starting outside linebacker for the Bengals during their first-ever season.

Buncom was slated to be a starter for the 1969 Bengals. On the morning of the Bengals' opening game of the 1969 regular season, on September 14, his roommate, Ernie Wright, was awakened to the sound of Buncom calling for him and gasping for breath. Neither Wright nor paramedics could save him. He was 29. The cause of death was determined to be a pulmonary embolism.

He was survived by his wife Sarah, later a principal in the San Diego Unified School District, and seven-week-old son, Frank James Buncom III. His former team, the Chargers, as well as the Bengals, established trust funds for Buncom's son.

When the San Diego Chargers announced their inaugural hall of fame class in 1976, Buncom was one of the four inductees.

Ron Mix, a San Diego attorney and former teammate of Buncom's, said, "I remember Frank as being the best of us, and I'm talking about as a person with high character."

His grandson, Frank Buncom IV, attended St. Augustine High School, where he was an outstanding defensive back as of 2014 being recruited by many Division I programs. On January 28, 2015, he signed to play at Stanford University.

See also
List of American Football League players

References

 

1939 births
1969 deaths
Players of American football from Shreveport, Louisiana
American football linebackers
USC Trojans football players
San Diego Chargers players
Cincinnati Bengals players
American Football League All-Star players
Deaths from pulmonary embolism
American Football League players
Susan Miller Dorsey High School alumni